Corona is a brand of beer produced by Mexican brewery Cervecería Modelo and owned by Belgian company AB InBev. It is the top-selling brand of imported beer in the United States. It is often served with a wedge of lime or lemon in the neck of the bottle to add tartness and flavor. The recipe for the mash bill includes corn as well as the barley malt and hops traditionally used for making beer.

The brand's most popular variation is Corona Extra, a pale lager. It is one of the top-selling beers worldwide, and Corona Extra has been the top-selling imported drink in the U.S. since 1998.

Other variants of the Corona beer brand include Corona Light, Corona Premier, and Corona Familiar. A variety of flavored hard seltzers marketed under the Corona brand name was launched in March 2020.

Ingredients 

According to Sinebrychoff, a Finnish company owned by the Carlsberg Group, Corona Extra contains barley malt, corn, hops, yeast, antioxidants (ascorbic acid), and propylene glycol alginate as a stabilizer.

Packaging
Corona beer is available in a variety of bottle presentations, ranging from the  ampolleta (labeled Coronita and just referred as the cuartito) up to the  Corona Familiar (known as the familiar, Litro or Mega). A draught version also exists, as does canned Corona in some markets.

The packaging is otherwise the same in Spain as in Mexico and the United States. In the United Kingdom, Canada, Australia, and the United States, smaller, 210ml (7 fl. oz) bottles of the beer are also branded as "Coronita".

Sponsorship partners

Corona was a longtime sponsor of boxing in Mexico, including sponsorship of Saturday night fights on Televisa, but reduced its sponsorship after Anheuser-Busch InBev took full control of the brand. In the United States, Constellation Brands continues to sponsor boxing through Corona, most notably with undefeated featherweight champion Floyd Mayweather Jr.

Corona was the title sponsor of the LPGA Tour tournament Corona Championship (later Tres Marias Championship) from 2005 to 2009, and of the NASCAR Mexico Corona Series (now NASCAR PEAK Mexico Series) from 2004 to 2011, the most followed stock car racing series in Mexico.

In addition, Corona is a "second sponsor" for four of the top-flight professional football teams of Mexico's first division, Liga MX. The teams sponsored by Corona are Atlas, Santos Laguna, Querétaro, Puebla, Chiapas, América, Pachuca, Morelia, León, Toluca, and Necaxa. Corona also sponsored the Mexico national football team.

Corona and the Association of Tennis Professionals (ATP) had a 5½–year sponsorship in which Corona was the ATP's premier worldwide sponsor. Corona was also the title sponsor of the SBK Superbike World Championship from 1998 until 2007.

Advertising

Corona commercials for both Corona Extra and Corona Light typically take place on a beach with the tagline "Miles Away From Ordinary" from 2000 to 2007. Since the early 2010s, the tagline "Find Your Beach" was used.

In 1990, Corona debuted "O Tannenpalm" which celebrated the Holidays. It featured a whistling rendition of the popular Christmas song "O Christmas Tree" as the lights go on one of the palm trees. The commercial has been played every year ever since during the month of December.

Use in cocktails
Some bars and restaurants serve a "Coronarita", a beer cocktail that consists of a bottle of Corona upturned to drain into a margarita.

COVID-19 pandemic

During the COVID-19 pandemic, the beer saw some controversy due to its similarity in name to coronaviruses. There was some reduction in the sales of the brand in China, but not in the United States (where the brand is much more popular than in China and where sales of the brand actually rose by 5% in early 2020), and the sales slump in China affected various brands, not just Corona. CNN reported that a survey by 5W Public Relations said that 38% of Americans would not buy Corona "under any circumstances" because they associate the name with the coronavirus outbreak, and another 14% said they would not order a Corona in public. The survey of 737 American beer drinkers over the age of 21 was conducted via phone on February 25 and 26, 2020. The PR firm's news release said the survey was carried out "regarding their opinions about the popular Mexican beer brand, Corona, as a result of the deadly COVID-19 coronavirus that's spreading around the world". However, the question responsible for the 38% statistic did not actually mention COVID-19 as a motivation, which might have instead simply indicated a preference for a different brand of beer. Among regular Corona drinkers, only 4% said they planned to stop drinking the brand. Snopes and FactCheck.org reported that the notion that the pandemic caused a sharp reduction in sales due to confusion over the name of the brand was simply false.

Production of the brand was briefly suspended in April 2020 because of government orders to temporarily close businesses, although the sales of the brand had not been harmed by the brand name's similarity with the virus' name. The company said that sales of the brand were up 8.9% in the first three months of 2020, and showed year-over-year growth of 24% in the first three weeks of March 2020, as American consumers were drinking more beer and alcoholic beverages while staying at home during the emerging pandemic.

See also
 Beer in Mexico
 Cocktail garnish
 Compañía Cervecera de Puerto Rico
 Shandy

References

External links

 

Beer in Mexico
Mexican brands
Products introduced in 1925